David Howard Turpin  (born 14 July 1956) is a Canadian scholar and the former university president. Turpin was the president and vice-chancellor of the University of Alberta (2015–2020) and the University of Victoria (2000 to 2013).

In 2010, he was appointed a member of the Order of Canada.

Early life and education
In 1977 Turpin received a BSc degree in cell biology from the University of British Columbia. In 1980 he received a PhD degree in botany and oceanography from the University of British Columbia.

Career 
From 2000 to 2013 Turpin was the president and vice-chancellor of the University of Victoria. Turpin was appointed the president and vice-chancellor of the University of Alberta in 2015. He did not seek renewal for a second term, and his term at the University of Alberta ended on 30 June 2020. Turpin is president emeritus of the University of Alberta.

Awards and distinctions 
 Honorary Doctor of Laws, University of Manitoba (2015)
 Queen's Diamond Jubilee Medal (2012)
 Member, Order of Canada (2010)
 ISI Highly Cited Researcher (2004)
 Queen's Golden Jubilee Medal (2002)
 Fellow, Royal Society of Canada (1998)
 Who's Who in Canada (1997)
 Who's Who in Science and Engineering (1996)
 Who's Who in America (1995)
 Darbaker Prize in Phycology, American Botanical Association (1991)

References

1956 births
Living people
Canadian university and college chief executives
Presidents of the University of Alberta
Fellows of the Royal Society of Canada
Members of the Order of Canada
People from Duncan, British Columbia
University of Victoria
University of British Columbia Faculty of Science alumni
Academic staff of the University of British Columbia